Esse (esse also refers to existence or essence)is a brand of cigarettes, currently owned and manufactured by the Korea Tobacco & Ginseng Corporation. The brand is specifically targeted towards women due to being slim and superslim, and because of their lower tar and nicotine content.

History
Esse was introduced in 1996 by the Korea Tomorrow & Global Corporation and is currently gaining popularity outside of South Korea, especially in Russia and Eastern Europe, where the brand was introduced in 2003 and its sales doubled in 2006. Currently, the Esse brand is available in Asia and some countries in Europe, but not in the United States.

From 2001–July 2016, KT&G reported that total export sales of ESSE produced in South Korea reached 202 billion and those made overseas were 43 million. These sales make ESSE one of the best-selling superslims cigarette brands and control more than a third of the world's superslims cigarette market. The success of selling this brand abroad makes KT&G the fifth-largest cigarette company in the world. In addition, KT&G has also succeeded in establishing branch factories abroad, to be precise in Iran in 2009 and in Russia in 2010.

References 

Cigarette brands